The 1983 Scottish Professional Championship was a professional non-ranking snooker tournament, which took place in August 1983 in Glasgow, Scotland.

Murdo MacLeod won the title by beating Eddie Sinclair 11–9 in the final.

Main draw

References

Scottish Professional Championship
Scottish Professional Championship
Scottish Professional Championship
Scottish Professional Championship
Sports competitions in Glasgow